Quasicaecilia is an extinct genus of microsaur. It is known from the Early Permian of Texas in the United States. A single specimen is known, collected from the Texas Permian redbeds by Charles Hazelius Sternberg in 1917. It was originally identified as a specimen of the gymnarthrid microsaur Cardiocephalus. The skull of Quasicaecilia superficially resembles those of extant but unrelated caecilians, hence the genus name. Quasicaecilia was assigned to the new family Brachystelechidae in 1991 along with the genera Batropetes and Carrolla.

See also
 List of prehistoric amphibian genera

References

Microsauria
Cisuralian amphibians of North America
Taxa named by Robert L. Carroll
Fossil taxa described in 1990